DC Showcase: The Phantom Stranger is an American animated short film based on the DC Comics character The Phantom Stranger, directed by Bruce Timm from a script by Ernie Altbacker and produced by Warner Bros. Animation and DC Entertainment. The short was included as part of the home media release of Superman: Red Son.

Plot
Set in the 1970s, Marcie, a young girl who seeks enlightenment, and freedom from her controlling parents, rides in a van along with a group of hippies named Dee Dee, Violet, Harry and Ted to California. The hippies are part of a cult led by a mysterious man named Seth, however, the group is unaware that they are being watched and followed by the Phantom Stranger who states "Not all those who wander are lost. But, many are and once lost, they may truly be lost forever." and arrives at the house not far from Los Angeles once owned by an old timer movie star, now owned by Seth. The group goes inside, but Marcie says she needs a cigarette break and waits outside. As she is having a smoke, Marcie, disgusted by the condition of the property as the lawn hasn't been mowed in weeks and the water fountain in the front yard was filthy and full of dead fish, crosses paths with the Phantom Stranger, who advises her that appearances are not what they seem. Marcie assumed he was Seth but he corrects her saying "No" and he asks her why are they following Seth. She tells him that she believes she and her friends are looking for truth, freedom, spiritual guidance in a world torn apart by war, pollution and lies. The Phantom Stranger tells her that truth lies not at the end of a road but inside those who walk the road. As she joins the others, the Stranger says that she should stay away from what is inside but when she is about to blow him off, he disappears and heads to the front door. Marcie is shocked to see an eye at the doorknob but (believing she is hallucinating) goes in. The hippies are happy to see her and they start drinking wine when Seth appears. He begins a ceremony by magically lighting candles and they have a dance party, smoking marijuana and drinking more wine until Seth performs a ritual marking foreheads of Dee Dee, Violet, Harry and Ted with the wine from his chalice and then starts kissing them. Seth is wearing a serpent pendant around his neck and every time he kisses the hippies, it glows and they all fall to the floor and then he turn to Marcie. Just when he is about to kiss her, Phantom Stranger intervenes. The latter reveals that Seth is a soul-eating vampire and the Ouroboros Pendent he is wearing gives him eternal life and power for a limited period and had been leading unsuspecting victims to their doom for centuries. Seth and Stranger engage in a sword fight and when Stranger has the upper hand over Seth, Marcie knocks him out cold with an Egyptian statute. As Seth feeds off Phantom Stranger's magical aura, Marcie finds her friends as drained husks. Realizing that Phantom Stranger was speaking the truth, she seduces Seth saying he is a "king of ages" but need a "queen". The ruse works long enough for her to grab the pendent and smashed it to pieces. Seth, his without immortality, turns to dust and ash. Phantom Stranger is pleased with the choice that Marcie made. As they leave the house, Stranger asks Marcie what will she do now. Would she keep searching for her truth. She replies the same words he once said "Truth lies not at the end of a road but inside those who walk the road.", and that she would keep traveling until she found it no matter how long or how far it would take, and bring it with her. When the Stranger disappears again, she drives off into the city but he is always looking out for her in the form of a giant silhouette in the night sky.

Cast
 Peter Serafinowicz as The Phantom Stranger
 Grey Griffin as Dee Dee, Violet
 Natalie Lander as Marcie 
 Michael Rosenbaum as Seth
 Roger Craig Smith as Harry, Ted

References

External links
 

2020 animated films
2020 direct-to-video films
2020 films
2020 short films
2020s American animated films
2020s animated superhero films
2020s direct-to-video animated superhero films
2020s Warner Bros. animated short films
DC Showcase